Emilio Larrosa (born Emilio Larrosa Irigoyen in Mexico) is a Mexican producer who has produced telenovelas and soap operas for Televisa.

Filmography

Awards and nominations

Premios TVyNovelas

Premios People en Español

References

External links

Living people
Mexican television writers
Mexican telenovela producers
1941 births